Cobalescou Island or Cobălcescu Island is a small snow-free island with two rounded summits, lying  east-southeast of Veyka Point, the south extremity of Two Hummock Island in the Palmer Archipelago, Antarctica.

The island was discovered and named by the Belgian Antarctic Expedition under Gerlache, 1897–99. The established name appears to be a corrupted spelling. The toponym was suggested to Gerlache by Emil Racovitza, Romanian zoologist and botanist of the Belgian Antarctic Expedition, for Romanian scholar Grigore Cobălcescu, a geologist of European reputation.

See also 
 Composite Antarctic Gazetteer
 List of Antarctic and sub-Antarctic islands
 List of Antarctic islands south of 60° S 
 SCAR
 Territorial claims in Antarctica

References

External links 

Islands of the Palmer Archipelago